Cecilia Carmen Linda Brækhus (born 28 September 1981) is a Norwegian professional boxer and former kickboxer. In boxing she reigned as the undisputed female welterweight champion from 2014 to 2020, and is the first woman in any weight class to hold the WBA, WBC, IBF and WBO titles simultaneously. She is also one of only 11 boxers in history, female or male, to hold all four major world titles simultaneously, along with Bernard Hopkins (2004–2005), Jermain Taylor (2005), Terence Crawford (2017), Oleksandr Usyk (2018–2019), Claressa Shields (2019–2020, 2021–), Katie Taylor (2019–), Jessica McCaskill (2020–), Josh Taylor (2021–), and Canelo Alvarez (2021-), Devin Haney (2022-) in 2016, she captured the IBO title, becoming the first ever boxer to hold five world titles from sanctioning bodies simultaneously.

In 2017, the Boxing Writers Association of America named Brækhus their inaugural Female Fighter of the Year. Guinness World Records awarded her with three recognitions in 2018: the Longest Reigning Female Boxing Champion, the Longest Reign as a Four-Belt Undisputed Boxing Champion, and the Most Bouts Undefeated by a Female World Champion Boxer. As of September 2020, she is ranked as the world's second best active female welterweight by The Ring and BoxRec, and the third best active female, pound-for-pound, by The Ring, fifth by ESPN, and sixth BoxRec.

Early life
Born in Cartagena, Colombia, Brækhus was adopted as a two-year-old by Norwegian parents and raised in the Sandviken area of Bergen. Brækhus started kickboxing at the age of fourteen.

Brækhus soon began competing in amateur boxing competitions, and achieved an amateur record of 75-5-0 before turning professional.

Kickboxing career (semi-contact)
 2003 WAKO World Champion, Semi Contact 65 kg
 2002 WAKO Euro Champion, Semi Contact 65 kg
 3 National Championships 
 2 H.M. The King's Trophy

Amateur boxing career
Brækhus fought 80 matches and won 75 of them.
 Silver medal at the 2005 World Championships
 Gold medal at the 2005 European Championships
 Silver medal at the 2004 European Championships

Professional boxing career
In November 2007, she signed a pro contract with German promoter Wilfried Sauerland, who announced his intention of making her the first Norwegian woman World Champion. Her first fight was against Croatian boxer Ksenija Koprek, 20 January 2007.

On 14 March 2009, she became the WBC World Champion in welterweight against Danish boxer Vinni Skovgaard. She also captured the vacant WBA female welterweight title.

Brækhus successfully defended her titles on 30 May 2009 against Amy Yuratovac in Helsinki, Finland, and on 12 September 2009 against Lucia Morelli in Herning, Denmark.

Eight months later, on 15 May 2010, Brækhus successfully defended her WBA and WBC titles against Victoria Cisneros from the United States, while winning the WBO title. The match was fought in Herning, Denmark. In a unanimous decision, the judges declared the fight for Brækhus, having won all 10 rounds. On 30 October 2010, in what was expected to be the hardest match of her career, Brækhus successfully defended her WBA, WBC and WBO titles against Mikaela Laurén from Sweden, while winning the World Professional Boxing Federation (WPBF) title. After Brækhus having dominated the whole match, she knocked Laurén out in the 7th round. The match was fought in Rostock, Germany.

In 2010, Brækhus was voted the "Female Boxer of the Year" by German boxing magazine BoxSport.

On 14 September 2014, after defeating Croatian Ivana Habazin, Brækhus became the first Norwegian and the first woman to hold all major world championship belts in her weight division (welterweight) in boxing history.

HBO broadcast its first women's bout, between Brækhus and Kali Reis, on May 5, 2018, which Brækhus won.

Professional boxing record

See also
List of female boxers
List of female kickboxers

References

External links

Cecilia Brækhus profile at Awakening Fighters
Cecilia Brækhus profile at Women Boxing Archive Network

1981 births
Living people
Norwegian women boxers
Colombian emigrants to Norway
Norwegian adoptees
Sportspeople from Bergen
Sportspeople from Cartagena, Colombia
Welterweight boxers
Norwegian female kickboxers
Norwegian expatriate sportspeople in Germany
World Boxing Association champions
World Boxing Council champions
International Boxing Federation champions
World Boxing Organization champions
International Boxing Organization champions
Light-welterweight boxers
World welterweight boxing champions
Norwegian people of Colombian descent